Tolti is a city that serves as the administrative capital of Kharmang District of Gilgit-Baltistan, Pakistan. The village lies on the left bank of the Indus, and is approximately 35 km south-east of the confluence of the Indus from the Shyok. It is today by a well-paved road that runs along the left bank of the Indus slightly from Skardu to reach out.

Historically, Tolti was on the trade route between Skardu and Kargil. The partition of the Kashmir region between India and Pakistan as a result of the First Kashmir War put an end to the trade route.

History
Tolti before 1840 belonged to the dominion of Kartaksho, one of the six small kingdoms Baltistan, but was ruled as a function of Kartaksho over longer time periods of one raja own family. Shortly after Tolti starts today a southern exclusion zone, so that from here onward travel after the Kharmang a few kilometers away.

Current status 

Tolti has produced several famous personalities, including Ghulam Hassan Lobsang, a renowned writer and author of the first Balti dictionary. Ghulam Muhammad Saboor, who is famous for his humorous criticism quotes, is also a beloved personality in the area. Apo Mirza Barkhan, known for his witty remarks, is another notable person from the area.

Tolti is also home to several educational and religious organizations, such as the Tolti Students Organization (TSF) and Imamia Students Organization (ISO), which are working to improve the educational environment and promote religious beliefs in the area. Several schools are located in the village, including the government boys' high school, Uswa Public School, girls' high school and few primary Schools. These schools provide opportunities for students to gain knowledge and skills in a structured environment. The government schools are likely funded by the government of Pakistan and provides education to students of Tolti as well as the students from the surrounding area such as Kamango, Pari etc. Uswa Public School is a private school that may offer a different educational experience than the government school. The girls' high school is an important resource for girls in the area, who may not have had access to education otherwise.

In addition to the schools, there are also several tuition centers in Tolti Kharmang, such as Babe ilm coaching center, Shaheen Academy, and Sunday school system. These tuition centers offer additional educational support to students, which can help them succeed in their studies. Babe ilm coaching center and Shaheen Academy are such institutions that offer tutoring services to students for the whole week, while Sunday school system may offer education on Sundays.

Overall, the educational resources available in Tolti Kharmang provide students with opportunities to learn and grow. By gaining knowledge and skills through education, the residents of Tolti Kharmang can improve their lives and contribute to their communities.

The village has several highly skilled artists, such as Ustad M Ali, Ustad Baqir, Ustad Hussain Chilpa, and Haji Mohsin Sons. Additionally, the village has several skilled drivers, such as Ustad Haider, Ustad Arif Batt, and Ustad Hassan SK. Tolti is also home to many talented poets, including Ali Kishwar, Taqi Karbalai, Jon Sahir, Iqbal Balay, and Haji Asghar. The people of Tolti are known for their humble, hardworking, cooperative, talented, and skillful nature.

The local administration in Tolti is managed by welfare societies like Asgharia Khair ul Amal. Education is highly valued in the village, which is reflected in the dedication of its teachers, such as Sir Fayyaz Hussain, Sir Muhammad Ali, Sir Kacho Shabbir, Sir Iqbal, and Sir Habib. Overall, Tolti is a small village with a rich cultural heritage, where people are dedicated to education and hard work, and are proud of their local customs and traditions

References 

Populated places in Kharmang District
Baltistan